Iskra (the Spark) was a political newspaper of Russian socialist emigrants established as the official organ of the Russian Social Democratic Labour Party (RSDLP).

History

Iskra was published in exile and then smuggled into Russia. Initially, it was managed by Vladimir Lenin, moving as he moved. The first edition was published in Leipzig, Germany, on December 1, 1900 (other sources say Dec. 11). Other editions were published in Munich (1900–1902) and Geneva from 1903. When Lenin was in London (1902–1903) the newspaper was edited from a small office at 37a Clerkenwell Green, EC1, with Henry Quelch arranging the necessary printworks.

Iskra quickly became the most successful underground Russian newspaper in 50 years.

In 1903, following the split of the RSDLP, Lenin left the staff (after his initial proposal to reduce the editorial board to three – himself, Julius Martov and Georgi Plekhanov – was vehemently opposed); the newspaper fell under the control of the Mensheviks and was published by Plekhanov until 1905. The average circulation was 8,000.

Political viewpoint

Iskras motto was "Из искры возгорится пламя" (Iz iskry vozgoritsya plamya — "From a spark a fire will flare up") — a line from the reply Alexander Odoevsky wrote to the poem by Alexander Pushkin addressed to the anti-tsar Decembrists imprisoned in Siberia. The editorial line championed the battle for political freedom as well as the cause of socialist revolution. The paper also ran a number of notable polemics against "economists", who argued against political struggle in favour of pure trade-union activity for the worker's economic interests, as well as the Socialist Revolutionaries, who advocated terror tactics. In the book What Is to Be Done?, Lenin argues that trade-union activity, although being a good starting point for revolution, would only stay at the level of trade-unionist politics and wouldn't be capable, in itself, to challenge the aristocracy or capitalism. Lenin, on the other hand, argues for a vanguard party, made up of professional revolutionaries, to lead the political struggle and raise the average worker to the level of revolutionaries.

As outlined by Lenin in What Is to Be Done?, Iskra took the place of a central project to cohere the RSDLP nationally.

Staff

Initial staff members:
 Vladimir Lenin (Vladimir Ilyich Ulyanov)
 Dmitri Ilyich Ulyanov, his younger brother
 Georgi Plekhanov
 Vera Zasulich
 Pavel Axelrod (Pinchas Borutsch)
 Julius Martov (Ilija Cederbaum)
 Aleksandr Potresov

Later:
 Leon Trotsky (Lev Davidovich Bronstein)

Some of the staff were later involved in the Bolshevik revolution of October 1917.

Blumenfeld did the printing. Leo Deutsch was the administrator of Iskra but did not share in the editorial work.

Savva Morozov was one of the people who financed the paper.

See also 
 Nina Printing House
 Pravda
 Kommunistka
 Zreniye

Footnotes

Further reading

 Allan K. Wildman, "Lenin's Battle with Kustarnichestvo: The Iskra Organization in Russia," Slavic Review, vol. 23, no. 3 (Sept. 1964), pp. 479–503. In JSTOR.

Communist newspapers
Newspapers published in the Russian Empire
Defunct newspapers published in Germany
Newspapers established in 1900
Publications disestablished in 1905
Russian Social Democratic Labour Party